Philip Eric Bourne (born 1953) is an Australian bioinformatician, non-fiction writer, and businessman. He is currently Stephenson Chair of Data Science and Director of the School of Data Science and Professor of Biomedical Engineering and was the first associate director for Data Science at the National Institutes of Health, where his projects include managing the Big Data to Knowledge initiative, and formerly Associate Vice Chancellor at UCSD. He has contributed to textbooks and is a strong supporter of open-access literature and software. His diverse interests have spanned structural biology, medical informatics, information technology, structural bioinformatics, scholarly communication and pharmaceutical sciences. His papers are highly cited, and he has an h-index above 50.

Education
Bourne was trained as a physical chemist in the mid to late 1970s and obtained his PhD in 1979 at the Flinders University.

Career and research
After his PhD, Bourne moved to the University of Sheffield to do postdoctoral research during 1979–1981, followed by a move to Columbia University, New York, in 1981. In 1995 he moved to University of California, San Diego, where he was a Professor in the Department of Pharmacology. In 2014, he moved to NIH to become its associate director for Data Science. In January 2017, it was announced that he had accepted a position as director of University of Virginia's Data Science Institute.

He is known for writing the book Unix for VMS Users (1990) and for being co-developer of the Combinatorial Extension algorithm for the three-dimensional alignment of protein structures, together with I. Shindyalov (1998). In 1999 he became co-director of the Protein Data Bank. He was president of the  ISCB (2002–2003). He is a fellow of the American Medical Informatics Association since 2002. He is founding Editor in Chief of  PLoS Computational Biology (2005-). In 2007 he co-founded SciVee. Bourne is an editor of the popular Ten Simple Rules series of editorials published in the PLoS Computational Biology journal. He has served as the Associate Vice Chancellor for Innovation and Industrial Alliances and a professor of pharmacology at the Skaggs School of Pharmacy and Pharmaceutical Sciences at the University of California, San Diego (UCSD).
He is an advisor to the Hypothes.is project and associate director for Data Science at the National Institutes of Health where his projects include managing the Big Data to Knowledge initiative.

Publications 
Bourne is author of numerous scientific articles and book chapters and editor of the Structural Bioinformatics textbook. and Pharmacy Informatics Other publications include:

 Structural Bioinformatics 1st edition 
  Structural Bioinformatics 2nd edition
 Pharmacy Informatics
 Unix for Vms Users

Awards and honors
Bourne was elected Fellow of the AAAS under Pharmaceutical Sciences in 2011 and Fellow of the International Society for Computational Biology (ISCB) in 2011. 
In 2010 he won Microsoft's Jim Gray e-Science award and in 2009 won the Benjamin Franklin Award (2009).

Personal life
Bourne has been married since 1983 to Roma Chalupa and they have two children: Scott Bourne (1985-) and Melanie Bourne (1997-). His interests include motorcycles, flying, and hiking

References

1953 births
Living people
Australian bioinformaticians
Australian chief executives
Australian expatriates in the United States
Australian non-fiction writers
Columbia University faculty
Fellows of the American Association for the Advancement of Science
Fellows of the International Society for Computational Biology
Flinders University alumni
University of California, San Diego faculty
University of Virginia faculty